Tate and Brady refers to the collaboration of the poets Nahum Tate and Nicholas Brady, which produced one famous work, New Version of the Psalms of David (1696). This work was a metrical version of the Psalms, and largely ousted the old version of T. Sternhold and J. Hopkins' Psalter. Still regularly sung today is their version of Psalm 34, "Through all the changing scenes of life" (which was improved in the second edition of 1698). As well as the 150 Psalms they also wrote metrical versions of the Lord's Prayer and the Apostles' Creed.

Because of the association between the authors and the collection, the work itself is sometimes referred to as "Tate and Brady". 

Tate's well-known Christmas carol "While Shepherds Watched Their Flocks by Night" was first printed in A Supplement to the New Version of the Psalms by Dr Brady and Mr Tate, published in 1700.

References

External links

 Tate and Brady's New Version of the Psalms of David
 HTML
 Facsimiles of print editions: London 1698, Oxford 1839

Psalters
Songwriting teams
Irish musical duos